Stephon Heyer (born January 16, 1984) is a former American football offensive tackle. He was signed by the Washington Redskins as an undrafted free agent in 2007. He played college football at Maryland.

He was also a member of the Oakland Raiders, New York Jets and BC Lions.

High school years
Heyer attended Brookwood High School in Snellville, Georgia and was a student and a two-year letterman in football.

College career
During his time at Maryland Heyer appeared in 50 games, with 37 starts at left tackle. He ended his college career by being selected and playing in the 2007 Hula Bowl. He earned honorable mention honors in 2006 as an All-ACC Lineman. After playing in the Champs Sports Bowl, Heyer was selected to the ESPN.com's All-Bowl team for his excellent play.  In 2004, he started in all 11 games at left tackle and ended the year being the terps highest rated lineman. In 2003, he started in all 13 games at left tackle, finished the season as the team's second highest rated lineman, and had only two penalties the entire season. In 2002, as a freshman, Heyer played in all 13 games, but started only one, and had only two penalties for the entire season.

Professional career

Washington Redskins
Heyer was signed by the Washington Redskins in 2007 as an undrafted free agent. Heyer became a full-time starter for the Redskins in 2009.

Oakland Raiders
On August 2, 2011, Heyer signed with the Oakland Raiders.

New York Jets
Heyer was signed by the New York Jets on May 29, 2012. He was released on August 20, 2012.

BC Lions
Heyer signed with the BC Lions on April 23, 2014.

Personal life
Heyer is the son of Ronald and Glenda Heyer. He was recruited by numerous division one colleges out of high school including: Michigan, Georgia, Arkansas, Clemson, Florida, Alabama, Ohio State, Kentucky, Vanderbilt, and Auburn. He graduated with a degree in criminology and criminal justice in 2006.

References

External links
Oakland Raiders bio
Maryland Terrapins bio

1984 births
Living people
Players of American football from Atlanta
American football offensive tackles
Maryland Terrapins football players
Washington Redskins players
Oakland Raiders players
New York Jets players